Mountain Zebra National Park is a national park in the Eastern Cape province of South Africa proclaimed in July 1937 for the purpose of providing a nature reserve for the endangered Cape mountain zebra.

History
In the early 1930s, the Cape mountain zebra was threatened with extinction. The National Parks Board of Trustees proclaimed a  area for the zebra's preservation in 1938 after the purchase of the farm Babylons Toren, Cradock the year before. The mountain zebra population of the park comprised only five stallions and one mare and was insufficient to expand the population. By 1950 only two stallions remained, and a neighbouring farmer, Mr H L Lombard, improved the breeding pool by donating eleven zebra to the park, five stallions and six mares.

By 1964, there were only 25 zebra in the park. From then on, the number of zebras increased steadily to about 140. In 1975, the zebras were re-introduced to the Western Cape at the De Hoop Nature Reserve.

Since 1978, capture and relocation of mountain zebra to new habitat have been part of the routine management of the park. Currently (2015) the park's herd number over 700 animals, and an average of about 20 animals are relocated each year. Through the years, additional farms have been purchased to increase the size of the park to the current .

Fauna 
Other mammals found in the boundaries of the park include caracal, Cape buffalo, black rhino, eland, black wildebeest, red hartebeest, gemsbok and grey rhebok. In 2007, the South African cheetahs were reintroduced to the area. In 2013 three lions have been released. A predator-proof fence prevents the large predators from entering neighboring farmland. The camps in the park have been fenced as well.

Mammals

Birds

Flora 
Species of trees found in the park are:

Tourism infrastructure

 19 Family cottages with 76 beds (each unit sleeps 4 people).
 One swimming pool (for overnight guests only).
 One camping terrain with 20 sites, each sleeping a maximum of 6 persons.
 Ablution and kitchen facilities on camp site
 One guest house sleeping 6 persons.
 Two overnight huts sleeping 10 persons each (for hiking trail) with approximately 39 km of hiking trails.

Visitor numbers 
From 1 April 2017 to 31 March 2018, the park received 31,210 visitors up from 27,965 in the previous year. This growth rate of 11.6% placed the park in the top five SANParks for percentage growth in visitors year-on-year.

External links

South African National Parks

References

Protected areas established in 1937
National parks of South Africa
Protected areas of the Eastern Cape